Yossi Atia (born in 1979 in Jerusalem), is an Israeli artist, active primarily as a film director, video artist, and actor.

Biography
Yossi Atia was born and raised in Jerusalem, Israel, to a Sephardic Jewish family. 

Studied directing and production at the Sam Spiegel Film and Television School, Jerusalem (2004).  Studied in Tel Aviv University, earned a BA in literature in 2007. Studied for his MFA in Directing and Production in Tel Aviv University's Film Department (2010).

Graduated from Ruth Dytches workshop, acting for Television and Film (2010). 

Between the years 2005–2010, Atia created and acted, together with Itamar Rose, in twenty short films. These were satirical short movies on contentious social and political issues. 

Their movies aimed that people take a new look at their reality and at disturbing issues. Their Movies break taboos, dealing with subjects such as homosexuality, bereavement, rape, occupation, suicide bombing and the war in Lebanon. 

Their films were screened initially at coffee shops, bars, clubs and galleries.

Since then, the films were screened in many museums and film festivals, including Pompidou Center, Paris; Tate Gallery, London; Rotterdam Film Festival; The Israeli Center for Digital Art, Holon; Herzliya Museum of Contemporary Art. 

In 2010 he created an Urban Comical Performance in Tel Aviv called "From a Fling to a Relationship".

During August 2012 Atia led a guided tour named “from trauma to fantasy" which was held as part of the cultural season in Jerusalem 4 times. The tour took place at Jerusalem's Jaffa Road following the footsteps of the Palestinian suicide bombings that had occurred in the area during the years 2000–2005.

 
The tour was recorded for a film Atia is making.

These days Atia is working on a feature film called "born in jerusalem and still alive". 

In 2015 he won the Jerusalem Pitch Point prize for his debut feature from Lia van Leer fund.

Atia lives and works in Tel Aviv.

Selected works
 Puddle – 2010 – Short film (10 min.) directed by Yossi Atia. A young man at a Purim party gets a phone call that is going to ruin his night.
 Darfur – 2008 – Building a barbed wire fence on the beach at Bat Yam, Rose and Atia role-play with pedestrian passers-by. Some are disguised as Sudanese refugees trying to cross the border, while the others played the Israeli border sentries.
 Sherutrom – 2006 – The Sherutrom is the annual fundraising telethon for the IDF. The movie attempts to show how the IDF, which receives the largest funding in Israel's national economy, beg for alms from already downtrodden citizens.     
 The Memorial Day – Atia and Rose offered citizens on the street the opportunity to commemorate themselves on video that would be broadcast in case they are killed in a terrorist attack.
 Kids in war – Filmed during the 2006 Lebanon War. Atia and Rose visited the seashore, disguised as children, and asked different people to play their parents. The "children" then asked them blunt and poignant questions about the reasons and justification of war.
 Missiles on Tel Aviv – In the 2006 Lebanon War, the Hezbollah launched missiles on central as well as northern Israel. Atia and Rose shot a news item as if a rocket had fallen in Tel Aviv. Their intent was to shoot the situation before it occurs and when the rocket lands they would add the rocket to the news item.
 The Jewish-Arab State – In 2020 the majority of Israel's citizens will be Arab. Atia and Rose went to Tayibe attempting to stage, with their Arab brethren, a vision of the unified Jewish-Arab State.

Further reading
 Keren Goldberg, "Truth or Dare: The Politics of Parafiction Art", Department of Critical Writing in Art and Design, Royal College of Art, London, U.K.  
 Keren Goldberg, "The Melting Pot – Parafiction Art in Israel and Palestine", in JAWS: Journal of Arts Writing by Students, Vol. 1, Issue 1, pp. 139–142 (January 2015)

External links

 Yossi Atia and Itamar Rose channel in You Tube
 born in jerusalem and still alive – Atia's film site
 "Puddle" movie in vimeo site
 (April 18, 2011), Israele, attenti a quei due, peace reporter
 (September 13, 2011), Israele, nessun dorma, peace reporter

References 

Israeli Sephardi Jews
Israeli film directors
Israeli video artists
21st-century Israeli male actors
Israeli male film actors
1979 births
Male actors from Jerusalem
Israeli Mizrahi Jews
Living people